That's Showbusiness is a game show that aired on BBC1 from 20 May 1989 to 8 July 1996 and hosted by Mike Smith.

Format
In the first three series, the game was played with two teams of three with team captains Kenny Everett and Gloria Hunniford competing. From the fourth series onwards, the game was played with two teams of two celebrities with no team captains competing. The quiz was split into various rounds and scoring was usually two points per answer or one point if offered across to the opposing team for a bonus. The rounds altered slightly from series to series. The following featured significantly:

Three Questions – based on a comedy clip.
Romantic Triangles – where the teams must try and guess which celebrity two other celebrities had been romantically involved with.
Guess which of these three people said this particular quote
Movie – Each team member would see a clip of a classic or newly released film and asked relevant questions on the film and/or its stars.
Videoke – Each team would sing along to a music video or performance, the video would fade out and hopefully, when it was faded back in again, they would be in the right place.
"Quickfire" – 12 themed questions to be answered alternately by teammates within one minute.

Transmissions

Series

Specials

References

External links
 
 

1989 British television series debuts
1996 British television series endings
1980s British game shows
1990s British game shows
BBC television game shows
English-language television shows